Giuseppe Pianetti (1631–1709) was a Roman Catholic prelate who served as Bishop of Todi (1673–1709).

Biography
Giuseppe Pianetti was born on 18 Jan 1631 in Iesi and ordained a priest on 19 Mar 1665. 
On 17 Jul 1673, he was appointed during the papacy of Pope Clement X as Bishop of Todi. 
On 30 Jul 1673, he was consecrated bishop by Gasparo Carpegna, Cardinal-Priest of San Silvestro in Capite, with Stefano Brancaccio, Bishop of Viterbo e Tuscania, and Giannotto Gualterio, Archbishop of Fermo, serving as co-consecrators. 
He served as Bishop of Todi until his death in February 1709.

References

External links and additional sources
 (for Chronology of Bishops) 
 (for Chronology of Bishops) 

17th-century Italian Roman Catholic bishops
18th-century Italian Roman Catholic bishops
Bishops appointed by Pope Clement X
1631 births
1709 deaths
People from Iesi